Reading Blue Mountain and Northern Railroad 425 is a 4-6-2 light "Pacific" type steam locomotive originally built in 1928 by the Baldwin Locomotive Works for the Gulf, Mobile & Northern Railroad. After the GM&N was consolidated into the Gulf, Mobile & Ohio in 1940, the locomotive was renumbered No. 580 and served in passenger service before being retired in 1950. The locomotive is currently owned and operated by the Reading & Northern, based out of Port Clinton, Pennsylvania in excursion service. In late 2022, No. 425 was taken out of service for its mandatory Federal Railroad Administration (FRA) 1,472 day inspection.

History

Revenue service

No. 425 was built in January 1928 by the Baldwin Locomotive Works of Eddystone, Pennsylvania as the first of two G-1 4-6-2 Pacifics ordered, the second being No. 426, for the Gulf Mobile and Northern (GM&N) to replace their four older Pacifics, which were sold to the Louisville and Nashville Railroad (L&N). Nos. 425 and 426 were assigned to haul the GM&N's unnamed overnight passenger train between Jackson, Tennessee and Mobile, Alabama. In 1940, they would later become Gulf, Mobile and Ohio Nos. 580 and 582, respectively until they were both retired in 1950.

20th century excursion service

Quickly after retirement, Nos. 580 and 582 were purchased by Paulson Spence for his Louisiana Eastern Railroad and renumbered as Nos. 4 and 3, respectively as part of a large fleet of steam engines which Spence had acquired over time and hauled trains of gravel and occasional passenger trips. When Spence died in 1961 and the Louisiana Eastern collapsed, No. 3 was sold for scrap (along with most of the line's engines), while #4 was purchased in 1962 by Malcolm Ottinger and became the main power of the Valley Forge Scenic Railroad of Kimberton, Pennsylvania, where it also regained its original number, 425.

In the 1970s, it was purchased by Brian Woodcock and others and moved to the Wilmington & Western Railroad, though it never operated on the line due to its high axle load. In 1983, it was sold to Andrew J. Muller, Jr. to power tourist trains on the newly formed Blue Mountain and Reading Railroad based out of Temple, Pennsylvania. The engine made many runs on this 26 miles shortline, as well as a few trips on the mainline. The high-stepping Pacific was later joined by Reading T-1 4-8-4 “Northern” 2102 in 1985. The Blue Mountain & Reading became much larger with the purchase of nearly 300 miles of former Conrail trackage throughout the early 1990s. The railroad was renamed to Reading, Blue Mountain and Northern (often shortened to Reading & Northern). In 1995 both names officially merged. Having more tracks gave the 425 and 2102 a large number of new areas to roam, and the engines became based out of the railroad's own headquarters of Port Clinton. It performed a doubleheader with the No. 2102 in 1988.

In 1992, No. 425 was repainted into a new dark royal blue paint scheme as opposed to its original black livery. The No. 425 locomotive made a guest appearance at the Steamtown National Historic Site Grand Opening in July 1995, along with several other steam locomotives including Baldwin Locomotive Works 26, Canadian Pacific 2317, Canadian National 3254, New York, Susquehanna and Western 142, and Milwaukee Road 261, and pulled a number of excursion trips out of Scranton, Pennsylvania. 425's last excursion was the Tamaqua Fall Fest on October 13, 1996, when steam operations on the RBM&N began to cease until 2008.

21st century excursion service

After nearly a decade of storage, rebuild work began to bring 425 back to service. Following two years of restoration, the Pacific made its first operation under steam on December 29, 2007, in a partially repainted appearance. Another test run was done on May 10–11, 2008 where the engine debuted in a new lighter blue color and an above-centered headlight. It made its return to excursion service in June 2008 on a round trip from Port Clinton to Jim Thorpe, a run it would make often. The RBMN's new star made many trips to Jim Thorpe and other locations over the next three years, with employee runs, tourist trains on the Lehigh Gorge Scenic Railway, and a featured attraction of the 2010 NRHS Convention.

After three successful seasons of excursions, Reading & Northern 425 was taken out of service to be repaired with the pilot and trailing trucks rebuilt by the Strasburg Rail Road, including conversion from plain bearings to more efficient roller bearings, rebuilding of the air compressor, a new blower and replacing the bottom part of the smokebox. Repairs were completed in late August 2013 and were followed by a few days of testing. The 425's first public outing after her overhaul was a return to Steamtown for the first time in 18 years for its annual Railfest. The No. 425 locomotive later operated on numerous trips out of Port Clinton, and also doubleheaded with recently restored Central Railroad of New Jersey 0-6-0 #113 on several trips. In August 2015, No. 425 was pulling regular passenger trains when it visited Jim Thorpe, Pennsylvania, meeting Nickel Plate Road 765 on a Norfolk Southern 21st Century Steam excursion. 

On September 4, 2017, No. 425 struck a car on the tracks leaving a parking lot in Jim Thorpe; the driver was uninjured. On August 13, 2022, No. 425 double headed with No. 2102 for the first time since 1988 to pull the Iron Horse Rambles train from Reading to Jim Thorpe. After running its last excursion trains such as the Autumn Leaf and the Santa Claus Special in November and December 2022, respectively, No. 425 was taken out of service for its mandatory Federal Railroad Administration (FRA) 1,472 day inspection.

See also 
 Atlanta and West Point 290
 Canadian Pacific 972
 Pennsylvania Railroad 1361
 Santa Fe 1316
 Soo Line 2719

References

Bibliography

Further reading

External links

Reading, Blue Mountain and Northern Home Page
Steam Locomotive 425

4-6-2 locomotives
Baldwin locomotives
Individual locomotives of the United States
Steam locomotives of the United States
Standard gauge locomotives of the United States
Railway locomotives introduced in 1928
Preserved steam locomotives of Pennsylvania